Anatoli Anatolyevich Balaluyev (born 16 February 1976) is a former Russian professional footballer.

He made his debut in the Russian Premier League in 2000 for FC Alania Vladikavkaz.

Honours
 Russian Second Division Zone West top scorer: 1999 (22 goals).

External links
  Profile at Footballfacts

1976 births
People from Shatursky District
Living people
Russian footballers
FC Spartak Vladikavkaz players
FC Oryol players
Russian Premier League players
Association football forwards
FC Dynamo Saint Petersburg players
FC Lukhovitsy players
FC Spartak-2 Moscow players
Sportspeople from Moscow Oblast